Ejutla District is located in the south of the Valles Centrales Region of the State of Oaxaca, Mexico.

Municipalities

The district includes the following municipalities:
 
Coatecas Altas
Ejutla de Crespo
La Compañia
La Pe
San Agustín Amatengo
San Andrés Zabache
San Juan Lachigalla
San Martín de los Cansecos
San Martín Lachilá
San Miguel Ejutla
San Vicente Coatlán
Taniche
Yogana

References

Districts of Oaxaca
Valles Centrales de Oaxaca